Pesticide Action Network (PAN) is "an international coalition of around 600 NGOs, citizens' groups, and individuals in about 60 countries."
which opposes pesticide use, and advocates what it proposes as more ecologically sound alternatives.

References

External links
 PAN International site

Environmental effects of pesticides
International environmental organizations
Pesticide organizations